Hitesh Bharadwaj (born 23 December 1991) is an Indian television actor, model, anchor, RJ and poet known for playing Ravi in Agar Tum Saath Ho, Manav Sharma / Vikram Diwan in Choti Sarrdaarni and Sanjay Pathak in Iss Mod Se Jaate Hain.

Life and family 
Hitesh Bharadwaj was born on 23 December 1991 in Mathura, Uttar Pradesh to his father Rakesh Bharadwaj and mother Kusum Lata Sharma. He also has a younger brother, Rahul Bharadwaj. Bharadwaj completed his schooling from Army School, Mathura and graduated from St. John's College, Agra. He married his girlfriend, Suditi Srivastava in 2019.

Career 
Bharadwaj first started his career as a News presenter in a local news channel on a monthly income of 2000 rupees. Then, prior to his career as an actor, he also worked as a RJ at BIG FM 92.7. Bharadwaj made his acting debut in 2012, with Suvreen Guggal – Topper of The Year. He rose to fame, in 2016, by playing the lead, Ravi in Hindi television series Agar Tum Saath Ho. Bharadwaj made his film debut, in 2018, with Jaane Kyon De Yaaron. 

Bharadwaj's most prominent roles were playing one of the leads, Manav Sharma / Vikram Diwan in Colors TV series Choti Sarrdaarni opposite Nimrit Kaur Ahluwalia and Sanjay Pathak in Iss Mod Se Jaate Hain. Since September 2022, he portrayed Ekampreet Singh Randhawa in Colors TV's popular drama Udaariyaan.

Currently, Bharadwaj is working as a RJ at 104.8 Ishq FM.

Filmography

Films

Television

Short–Films

See also 

 List of Indian actors
 List of Indian television actors

References

External links 
 

Living people
Indian television actors
Indian male soap opera actors
21st-century Indian male actors
Indian male television actors
Male actors in Hindi television
People from Mathura
Actors from Uttar Pradesh
1991 births